Suli or Senie Lake is a lake in the western Qarhan Playa north of Golmud in the Haixi Prefecture of Qinghai Province in northwestern China. It is fed from the west by the Urt Moron River. Like the other lakes of the surrounding Qaidam Basin, it is extremely saline; like the other lakes of the surrounding Bieletan subbasin, it is rich in lithium. Its underlying salt has also trapped one of China's largest onshore natural gas fields.

Name
Suli and Sheli are romanizations of the lake's Mongolian name, which derives from a word for "temples" or "sideburns". (Compare Manchu , šulu.) Senie is the pinyin romanization of the Mandarin pronunciation of the name's transcription into Chinese characters.

Geography
It is located north of South Suli Lake and northwest of Dabiele Lake. It is fed from the west by the Urt Moron or Utumeiren   Wūtúměirén Hé). Its depth usually does not exceed .

Geology
Suli's position at the western end of the playa means that its waters are relatively less influenced by the concentrated mineral springs along the playa's northern boundary. Its waters are also less saturated with potassium-rich carnallite than other southern lakes, such as Tuanjie. The lithium derives from hot springs located near Mount Buka Daban which now feed the Narin Gol River or Hongshui River   Hóngshuǐ Hé) that flows into East Taijinar Lake. In the past, however, the springs lay within the "Kunlun" paleolake which until about 30,000 years ago produced a river which flowed north into a broad alluvial fan feeding the "Qarhan" paleolake in the Sanhu area. Bieletan's lithium came both from deposits directly flowing into the area at the time and continuing contributions from the Urt Moron and other rivers arising in and flowing through the former alluvial plain.

North of Suli Lake, the Sebei-1 and Sebei-2 gas fields form China's 4th-largest onshore reserve of natural gas, with production capacity of 4.95 billion cubic meters (175 billion cubic feet) per year. A pipeline connects it directly to Xining and Lanzhou.

History

The nearby gas fields were first exploited in 1974.

See also
 Qarhan Playa & Qaidam Basin
 List of lakes and saltwater lakes of China

Notes

References

Citations

Bibliography
 .
 .
 .
 .
 .
 .
 .
 .
 .
 .

Lakes of China
Lakes of Qinghai
Haixi Mongol and Tibetan Autonomous Prefecture